Glaneirw is an old mansion in the  community of Aberporth, Ceredigion, Wales, which is 72 miles (115.8 km) from Cardiff and 192 miles (309 km) from London. Glaneirw is represented in the Senedd by Elin Jones (Plaid Cymru) and is part of the Ceredigion constituency in the House of Commons.

References

See also
List of localities in Wales by population

Villages in Ceredigion